Altineu Côrtes Freitas Coutinho (born 13 September 1968), better known as simply Altineu Côrtes, is a Brazilian politician and businessman. He has spent his political career representing Rio de Janeiro, having served as state representative since 2015.

Personal life
Côrtes was born to Altineu Pires Coutinho and Angela Maria Freitas. He is a member of  the Assembleias de Deus church.

Political career
Côrtes voted in favor of the impeachment motion of then-president Dilma Rousseff. Côrtes would vote against a similar corruption investigation into Rousseff's successor Michel Temer, and he voted in favor of the 2017 Brazilian labor reforms.

References

1968 births
Living people
People from São Gonçalo, Rio de Janeiro
Brazilian businesspeople
Brazilian Pentecostals
Liberal Party (Brazil, 2006) politicians
Brazilian Democratic Movement politicians
Workers' Party (Brazil) politicians
Members of the Chamber of Deputies (Brazil) from Rio de Janeiro (state)
Members of the Legislative Assembly of Rio de Janeiro